
Joseph-François Foullon de Doué, or Foulon de Doué (25 June 1715 – 22 July 1789), was a French politician and a Controller-General of Finances under Louis XVI. A deeply unpopular figure, he has the ignominious distinction of being the first recorded person to have been lynched à la lanterne.

Offices
Born in Saumur, Maine-et-Loire, Foullon served as Intendant-General of the Armies during the Seven Years' War, and as Intendant of the Army and Navy under Marshal de Belle-Isle. In 1771 he was appointed Intendant of Finances. In 1789, when Jacques Necker was dismissed, the reactionary Court party nominated Foullon as Controller-General of Finances and minister of the king's household in the new government.

Foullon became unpopular on all sides. The farmers-general resented his severity, and the Parisians his wealth, viewed as resulting from the exploitation of the poor. An unsubstantiated rumor accused him of having said during an earlier famine: "If those rascals have no bread, then let them eat hay". A staunch conservative, he also was very hostile to Louis Philippe d'Orléans' circle.

Foullon was a member of the Parliament of Paris immediately prior to the French Revolution, nicknamed Ame damnée (familiar demon).

Refuge and murder
After the storming of the Bastille on 14 July, Foullon fled from Paris to his friend Antoine de Sartine's house at Viry-Châtillon, a few miles south of the capital. Aware of the feeling against him Foullon had reports of his own death circulated.

On 22 July Foullon was captured by the peasants on Sartine's estate, and taken to the Hôtel de Ville. Made to walk barefoot, he had a bundle of hay tied to his back, was given peppered vinegar to drink, and had the sweat on his face wiped off with nettles.

In Paris Jean Sylvain Bailly and the Marquis de La Fayette tried to intervene but Foullon was dragged by the populace to the Place de Grève. As he was hanged from a lamp-post, the rope broke three times in a row — so members of the crowd decided to behead him instead, before parading his head on a pike with his mouth stuffed with grass, hay and excrement.

Foullon's son-in-law Bertier de Sauvigny, the intendant of Paris was confronted by the severed head before being lynched himself. The nature of the killing of both Foullon and Bertier was endorsed by Antoine Barnave, a member of the new National Legislative Assembly, with the comment: "What, then, is their blood so pure?".

Foullon's killing is mentioned in Charles Dickens' A Tale of Two Cities. It is also discussed in Thomas Paine's Rights of Man (1791), in which Paine likens Foullon's ordeal to that of Robert-François Damiens, executed in 1757 following an attempted regicide, in order to argue that the Reign of Terror was the result of behaviour learned from the rulers of the Ancien Régime.

References

 In turn, it cites as references:
Eugène Bonnemère, Histoire des paysans (4th ed., 1887), tome iii
Charles Louis Chassin, Les Élections et les cahiers de Paris en 1789 (Paris, 1889), tomes iii. and iv.

1715 births
1789 deaths
French monarchists
French Ultra-royalists
French counter-revolutionaries
People from Saumur
Ancien Régime office-holders
People of the French Revolution
Assassinated French politicians
Lynching deaths
Lords of France
A Tale of Two Cities characters
People murdered in Paris
Fermiers généraux